Catarhoe is a genus of moths in the family Geometridae erected by Claude Herbulot in 1951.

Species
 Catarhoe arachne Wiltshire, 1967
 Catarhoe basochesiata (Duponchel, 1831)
 Catarhoe cuculata (Hufnagel, 1767) – royal mantle
 Catarhoe cupreata (Herrich-Schäffer, 1838)
 Catarhoe nyctichroa (Hampson, 1912)
 Catarhoe permixtaria (Herrich-Schäffer, 1851)
 Catarhoe putridaria (Herrich-Schäffer, 1852)
 Catarhoe rubidata (Denis & Schiffermüller, 1775) – ruddy carpet
 Catarhoe yokohamae (Butler, 1881)

References

Xanthorhoini